Rose M. Mutiso is a Kenyan activist and materials scientist. She is co-founder and CEO of The Mawazo Institute. She is the research director of the Energy for Growth Hub. She was short listed for the 2020 Pritzker Emerging Environmental Genius Award.

Education 
Mutiso attended engineering school at Dartmouth College, before completing her PhD in Materials Science at the University of Pennsylvania in the lab of Karen I. Winey. Her dissertation focused material properties for nanoelectronics such as electrical percolation. She did her postdoc as a 2013-14 congressional science fellow with the American Institute of Physics.

Career 
Mutiso was a fellow in the U.S. Department of Energy. She was Energy and Innovation Policy Fellow in the office of Senator Chris Coons (as part of her postdoc). 

Mutiso's activism work focuses on improving energy access in Africa in a climate-conscious way. Through the Mawazo Institute she hopes to train more women in the research and engineering skills necessary to further develop the Kenyan energy sector. She served on the advisory board for African Utility Week 2018. She has advocated for international carbon budgeting that recognizes both the comparatively low current emissions of African nations and allots space for their future development into higher energy consumptions. She has written for Scientific American and also given a TED talk on the topic.

References

External links 
 Our Team The Mawazo Institute.
 Research Director - Rose Mutiso

21st-century Kenyan women scientists
21st-century Kenyan scientists
Condensed matter physicists
Year of birth missing (living people)
Living people
Dartmouth College alumni
University of Pennsylvania alumni
Women chief executives
21st-century Kenyan businesswomen
21st-century Kenyan businesspeople